Marjan Davari (b. April 24, 1966; Tehran, Iran) is an Iranian researcher, translator and writer who has been studying, teaching, translating and researching philosophical texts for more than 20 years.

Marjan was arrested at her father's home on September 23, 2015 in Karaj and has been held in a women's jail Qarchak prison (زندان قرچک), She subsequently was sentenced to death for blasphemy and an additional 16 months' imprisonment for insulting the Supreme Leader Ali Khamenei.

Education and work

She finished elementary school in UK and after returning to Iran, at an international Parthian school. She received an English translation diploma when she was 13 and continued her studies at Alzahra University in graphic design and painting, in addition to research and translation in inner-science, eastern and western ontology.

Her published translated works include Talons of Time of Paul Twitchell, The Seeker of Phil Morimitsu and The Spiritual Exercises of ECK of Harold Klemp.

She concentrated solely on inner-science and eastern ontology and worked as a researcher and teacher of Metaphysics at the Rah-e Ma’refat (Road of Wisdom) institute. She considers herself a free researcher in the field of esoteric science and metaphysics. She was also a teacher at Rah-e Ma’refat institute.

Her collected works and writings were kept in an archive to be available for her fans for free but have been confiscated by the security forces.

Arrest and trial

Timeline:
September 2015:
Arrested at her father's home in Mehr Shahr in Karaj, west of Tehran.
Held in solitary confinement in Evin Prison’s Ward 209 for three months which is controlled by the Intelligence Ministry.
No access to a lawyer or any kind of legal consultancy.
Eventually transferred to the Women’s Ward.
Charged with
Conspiracy against the Islamic Regime.
Being a member of Eckankar.
Spreading corruption on earth.
Having a love affair.
Insulting the Supreme Leader of Iran.
March & October 2016:
Interrogation and hearings session held in Branch 15 of the Islamic Revolutionary Court.
Presided over by Judge Abolqasem Salavati.
February 2017:
Transferred to the women’s prison located in Qarchak (زندان قرچک).
12 March 2017:
Sentenced to death for blasphemy and an additional 16 months for insulting Supreme Leader Ali Khamenei by the 15th branch of the Islamic Revolutionary Court in Tehran.
Presided over by Judge Abolqasem Salavati.

International response
On March 2017, Red T a nonprofit organization dedicated to the protection of translators and interpreters published an open letter to Mr. Ali Khamenei with this subject : "No Death for Content - Free Translator Marjan Davari". On 16 March 2017, Some of Marjan's supporters started an online petition at Change.org to raise awareness about her condition and urging Amnesty International to take appropriate action to stop the execution of Marjan Davari. This petition is available in most common languages, such as English, French, German, Italian, Spanish, Japanese, Chinese, Dutch and Persian. This petition was signed by 30,068 supporters in many countries and is now closed.

See also
Nazanin Zaghari-Ratcliffe
Ghoncheh Ghavami
Atena Daemi
Narges Mohammadi
Arash Sadeghi
Mohammad Ali Taheri

References

External links
Golrokh Ebrahimi Iraee

Living people
Iranian prisoners and detainees
Iranian prisoners sentenced to death
1966 births